Rostellariella lorenzi is a species of sea snail, a marine gastropod mollusk in the family Strombidae. It is found in the Arafura and Ceram Seas in Indonesia. The size of an adult shell varies between 85mm and 100mm.

References

 Morrison H.M. (2005) Description of Rostellariella lorenzi spec. nov. from the Arafura Sea area of Eastern Indonesia (Gastropoda: Stromboidea: Rostellariidae). Visaya 1(4): 15-23. [April 2005]

External links
 

Rostellariidae
Gastropods described in 2005